Huascar Leandro Brazobán (born October 15, 1989) is a Dominican professional baseball pitcher for the Miami Marlins of Major League Baseball (MLB). He made his MLB debut in 2022.

Professional career
Brazoban begin his professional career playing for the Colorado Rockies minor league affiliates from 2012 to 2017. In 2018, Brazoban signed with the Lancaster Barnstormers of the Atlantic League of Professional Baseball. After a two-year hiatus, in 2021, Brazoban pitched for the High Point Rockers of the Atlantic League of Professional Baseball. On January 4, 2022, Brazoban signed a contract with the Miami Marlins, where he was assigned to their Triple-A affiliate, Jacksonville Jumbo Shrimp. On July 24, Brazoban made his Major League Baseball debut against the Pittsburgh Pirates at the age of 32. He threw one inning of scoreless baseball, striking out his first batter faced, Oneil Cruz.

See also
 List of Major League Baseball players from the Dominican Republic

References

External links

1989 births
Living people
People from Santo Domingo Norte
Dominican Republic expatriate baseball players in the United States
Major League Baseball players from the Dominican Republic
Major League Baseball pitchers
Miami Marlins players
Dominican Summer League Rockies players
Tri-City Dust Devils players
Modesto Nuts players
Tiburones de La Guaira players
Lancaster JetHawks players
Hartford Yard Goats players
Leones del Escogido players
Charros de Jalisco players
High Point Rockers players
Gigantes del Cibao players
Jacksonville Jumbo Shrimp players